The Bank of Montreal's Head Office is located on 119, rue Saint Jacques (119, Saint Jacques Street) in Montreal, Quebec, Canada, across the Place d'Armes from the Notre-Dame Basilica in the Old Montreal neighbourhood. The Bank of Montreal is the oldest bank in Canada, founded in 1817. Although it still remains the bank's legal headquarters, its operational head office was moved to First Canadian Place in Toronto in 1977 due to political instability in Quebec.

The centrepiece of the complex is the Bank of Montreal Main Branch, a Pantheon-like building built by John Wells in 1847. The building was inspired by the design of the former headquarters of the Commercial Bank of Scotland in Edinburgh.

The building is in neoclassical style. The sculpted pediment of the building was done by Sir John Steell. Enlargements to the building were made in 1901–1905 by the New York City firm of McKim, Mead & White.

Bank of Montreal Museum
The Bank of Montreal Museum features exhibits about the history of the bank, including a 19th-century teller's window, photos, coins and banknotes, cheques, and mechanical piggybanks. The displays are located in the passage between the old building and the current head office. The museum is open during regular bank hours and admission is free.

Gallery

See also

Other bank buildings in Montreal:

 Old Canadian Bank of Commerce Building, Montreal
 Old Royal Bank Building, Montreal
 Molson Bank Building, Montreal
 Tour CIBC

Other BMO buildings:

 First Canadian Place - operational head office of BMO in Toronto

References

Rémillard, François, Old Montreal — A Walking Tour, Ministère des Affaires culturelles du Québec, 1992

External links
Bank of Montreal Head Office, Montreal information from Vieux-Montréal 
Photograph:Bank of Montreal Building, circa 1860 - McCord Museum
Photograph:Bank of Montreal Building, circa 1871 - McCord Museum
Photograph:Bank of Montreal Building, circa 1880 - McCord Museum
Photograph:Bank of Montreal Building, 1890 - McCord Museum
Photograph:Bank of Montreal Building, circa 1906 - McCord Museum
Photograph:Bank of Montreal Building, 1911 - McCord Museum

1847 establishments in Canada
Bank of Montreal
Commercial buildings in Montreal
Commercial buildings completed in 1847
Historic bank buildings in Canada
McKim, Mead & White buildings
Neoclassical architecture in Canada
Old Montreal
John Wells (architect) buildings
Headquarters in Canada